Gustav Tang Isaksen (born 19 April 2001) is a Danish professional footballer who plays as a right winger for Danish Superliga club Midtjylland.

Club career
Growing up in Hjerk, Salling, Isaksen moved to the Midtjylland academy from Roslev IK at under-12-level, after having started playing football as a three-year-old.

After he signed his first professional contract in May 2019 – a five-year deal – he made his debut on 25 August 2019 in the Danish Superliga when he came on as a substitute for Awer Mabil in the 78th minute of the 2–0 away win over SønderjyskE. He made his first ever start on 29 September in a 1–0 loss to OB in the domestic league. At the end of the season, Midtjylland won the Superliga title, with Isaksen recording 15 appearances.

On 25 November 2020, Isaksen made his first European appearance, coming on as a substitute for Anders Dreyer in the 82nd minute of a 3–1 loss to Ajax in the UEFA Champions League group stage. He scored his first professional goal on 11 February 2021 in the Danish Cup quarter-final first leg against OB. Starting as a right winger, he netted the 2–1 winner.

On 20 February 2023, Isaksen scored his first hat-trick in Midtjylland's spring opener against Viborg, which ended in a 4–0 victory.

International career
Isaksen played for various Danish national youth teams. On 4 September 2020, he made his Denmark under-21 debut in a 1–1 draw against Ukraine, coming on as a substitute for Rasmus Carstensen in the 81st minute.

Career statistics

Honours
Midtjylland
 Danish Superliga: 2019–20

References

External links
 Profile at the FC Midtjylland website
 
 
 

Living people
2001 births
People from Skive Municipality
Association football forwards
Danish men's footballers
Denmark youth international footballers
Denmark under-21 international footballers
FC Midtjylland players
Danish Superliga players
Sportspeople from the Central Denmark Region